Dejan Radonjić (born 23 July 1990) is a Croatian professional footballer who plays as a forward for HNK Šibenik of the Croatian First Football League.

Club career
Radonjić signed with Istra 1961 in the summer of 2013.

Radonjić transferred to Dinamo Zagreb for a fee of €500,000 after an impressive first season in Prva HNL. He made his debut for Dinamo Zagreb on 18 July 2014 in a 4–0 win against Slaven Belupo. On 4 August 2014, Dejan rejoined Istra 1961 on loan after failing to secure a spot in the starting eleven.

On 26 August 2015, Radonjić joined Israeli side Maccabi Tel Aviv on a one-year loan deal from Dinamo Zagreb a day after Maccabi qualified to the Champions League group stage. On 12 September, Radonjić made his debut against Ironi Kiryat Shmona.

After two seasons on loan at Lokomotiva Zagreb, Radonjić was moved there fully on a year-long contract.

On 26 June 2019, he joined Russian Premier League club PFC Krylia Sovetov Samara. On 26 August 2020, he terminated his contract with Krylia Sovetov by mutual consent. He subsequently signed for Chinese Super League club Qingdao.

Anorthosis Famagusta
On 28 July 2022, Radonjić joined Anorthosis Famagusta F.C. of the Cypriot First Division on a one-year deal.

HNK Šibenik
On 1 February 2023, Radonjić returned to Croatia, signing a contract with Šibenik until the end of the season.

References

External links
 

1990 births
Living people
People from Bodenseekreis
German people of Croatian descent
Association football forwards
German footballers
Croatian footballers
FV Ravensburg players
NK Istra 1961 players
GNK Dinamo Zagreb players
Maccabi Tel Aviv F.C. players
Hapoel Ra'anana A.F.C. players
NK Lokomotiva Zagreb players
PFC Krylia Sovetov Samara players
Qingdao F.C. players
Tianjin Jinmen Tiger F.C. players
Anorthosis Famagusta F.C. players
Croatian Football League players
Israeli Premier League players
Russian Premier League players
Chinese Super League players
Russian First League players
Cypriot First Division players
Croatian expatriate footballers
Expatriate footballers in Israel
Croatian expatriate sportspeople in Israel
Expatriate footballers in Russia
Croatian expatriate sportspeople in Russia
Expatriate footballers in China
Croatian expatriate sportspeople in China
Expatriate footballers in Cyprus
Croatian expatriate sportspeople in Cyprus